Broken Memories is a 2017 American drama film written by Frankie Lauderdale, directed by Michael Worth, and distributed by Freestyle Digital Media. The film stars Ivan Sergei, Rance Howard, Kelly Greyson and Cerina Vincent. The film premiered at the Writers Guild Theater, Beverly Hills on Tuesday, November 14, 2017, and included appearances of Ron Howard and Bryce Dallas Howard.

The film received critical acclaim from Alzheimer’s-related organizations for realistic portrayal of progressing dementia in old age and highlighted the role of caregivers in Alzheimer's nursing.

Cast
Ivan Sergei as Levi
Rance Howard as Jasper
Kelly Greyson as Maggie
Cerina Vincent as Sara
Kirk Bovill as Sheriff Bill Watson
Kassi Crews as Carla
Chris Fogleman as Dudley
Jessica Gardner as Gladys
Travis Guba as Ferlon Ramsey
Lindsey Lamer as Emmie

Accolades

Reception
On review aggregator website Rotten Tomatoes, the film has  a weighted average of 6.9/10 based on 182 reviews. Writing for HuffPost, Julie Spira said "Broken Memories depicts the real-life struggles a family goes through when a loved one suffers from Alzheimer’s disease." Writing for Broadway World, Herbert Paine concluded:"BROKEN MEMORIES gives us the reel to cast about for our own answers while vividly reflecting the struggles that attend our passages from one phase of life to another."
 
Ron Howard said his father’s performance in the film was “the role of his career to date.”

References

External links

 Broken Memories Official Website

2017 films
2017 drama films
American drama films
Films about old age
2010s English-language films
2010s American films